The 2019 Colonial Athletic Association football season was the thirteenth season of football for the Colonial Athletic Association (CAA) and part of the 2019 NCAA Division I FCS football season.

Previous season

Despite being picked eighth in the preseason poll, Maine won the CAA championship outright with a conference record of 7–1. They were joined in the FCS playoffs by James Madison, Stony Brook, Towson, Delaware, and Elon. It marked the first time in FCS history that any conference qualified six teams for the playoffs.

In the first round of the playoffs, James Madison defeated conference mate Delaware, while Stony Brook, Towson, and Elon lost their matchups. In the second round, James Madison fell to Colgate while 7-seed Maine, which had received a first-round bye, defeated Jacksonville State. Maine defeated 2-seed Weber State in the quarterfinals before falling to Eastern Washington in the semifinals.

Head coaches

Rankings

Regular season

All times Eastern time.

Rankings reflect that of the STATS FCS poll for that week.

Week Zero

Week One

Players of the week:

Week Two

Players of the week:

Week Three

Players of the week:

Week Four

Players of the week:

Week Five

Players of the week:

Week Six

Players of the week:

Week Seven

Players of the week:

Week Eight

Players of the week:

Week Nine

Players of the week:

Week Ten

Players of the week:

Week Eleven

Players of the week:

Week Twelve

Players of the week:

Week Thirteen

Players of the week:

FCS playoffs

Attendance

NFL Draft
The following list includes all CAA players who were drafted in the 2020 NFL Draft.

References